Pierre Maurice Marie Duhem (9 June 1861 – 14 September 1916) was a French theoretical physicist who worked on thermodynamics, hydrodynamics, and the theory of elasticity.  Duhem was also a historian of science, noted for his work on the European Middle Ages, which is regarded as having created the field of the history of medieval science. As a philosopher of science, he is remembered principally for his views on the indeterminacy of experimental criteria (see Duhem–Quine thesis).

Theoretical physics
Among scientists, Duhem is best known today for his work on chemical thermodynamics, and in particular for the Gibbs–Duhem and Duhem–Margules equations.  His approach was strongly influenced by the early works of Josiah Willard Gibbs, which Duhem effectively explicated and promoted among French scientists.  In continuum mechanics, he is also remembered for his contribution to what is now called the Clausius–Duhem inequality.
 
Duhem was convinced that all physical phenomena, including mechanics, electromagnetism, and chemistry, could be derived from the principles of thermodynamics. Influenced by Macquorn Rankine's "Outlines of the Science of Energetics", Duhem carried out this intellectual project in his Traité de l'Énergétique (1911), but was ultimately unable to reduce electromagnetic phenomena to thermodynamic first principles.

With Ernst Mach, Duhem shared a skepticism about the reality and usefulness of the concept of atoms.  He therefore did not follow the statistical mechanics of Maxwell, Boltzmann, and Gibbs, who explained the laws of thermodynamics in terms of the statistical properties of mechanical systems composed of many atoms.

Duhem was an opponent of Albert Einstein's theory of relativity. In 1914, Duhem commented that Einstein's relativity theory "has turned physics into a real chaos where logic loses its way and common-sense runs away frightened". In his 1915 book La Science Allemande, he argued strongly against relativity. Duhem stated that the theory of relativity "overthrow[s] all the doctrines in which one has spoken of space, of time, of movement, all the theories of mechanics and of physics".

History of science

Duhem is well known for his work on the history of science, which resulted in the ten volume Le système du monde: histoire des doctrines cosmologiques de Platon à Copernic (The System of World: A History of Cosmological Doctrines from Plato to Copernicus). Unlike many former historians (e.g. Voltaire and Condorcet), who denigrated the Middle Ages, he endeavored to show that the Roman Catholic Church had helped foster Western science in one of its most fruitful periods. His work in this field was originally prompted by his research into the origins of statics, where he encountered the works of medieval mathematicians and philosophers such as John Buridan, Nicole Oresme and Roger Bacon, whose sophistication surprised him. He consequently came to regard them as the founders of modern science, having in his view anticipated many of the discoveries of Galileo Galilei and later thinkers. Duhem concluded that "the mechanics and physics of which modern times are justifiably proud to proceed, by an uninterrupted series of scarcely perceptible improvements, from doctrines professed in the heart of the medieval schools."

Duhem popularized the concept of "saving the phenomena." In addition to the Copernican Revolution debate of "saving the phenomena" (Greek σῴζειν τὰ φαινόμενα, sozein ta phainomena) versus offering explanations that inspired Duhem was Thomas Aquinas, who wrote, regarding eccentrics and epicycles, thatReason may be employed in two ways to establish a point: firstly, for the purpose of furnishing sufficient proof of some principle. [...] Reason is employed in another way, not as furnishing a sufficient proof of a principle, but as confirming an already established principle, by showing the congruity of its results, as in astronomy the theory of eccentrics and epicycles is considered as established, because thereby the sensible appearances of the heavenly movements can be explained; not, however, as if this proof were sufficient, forasmuch as some other theory might explain them. [...]

Philosophy of science

In philosophy of science, Duhem is best known for arguing that hypotheses are not straightforwardly refuted by experiment and that there are no crucial experiments in science. Duhem’s formulation of his thesis is that “if the predicted phenomenon is not produced, not only is the questioned proposition put into doubt, but also the whole theoretical scaffolding used by the physicist”.  Duhem's views on the philosophy of science are explicated in his 1906 work The Aim and Structure of Physical Theory. In this work, he opposed Newton's statement that the Principia's law of universal mutual gravitation was deduced from 'phenomena', including Kepler's second and third laws. Newton's claims in this regard had already been attacked by critical proof-analyses of the German logician Leibniz and then most famously by Immanuel Kant, following Hume's logical critique of induction. But the novelty of Duhem's work was his proposal that Newton's theory of universal mutual gravity flatly contradicted Kepler's Laws of planetary motion because the interplanetary mutual gravitational perturbations caused deviations from Keplerian orbits. Since no contingent proposition can be validly logically deduced from any it contradicts, according to Duhem, Newton must not have logically deduced his law of gravitation directly from Kepler's Laws.

Opposition to the English inductivist tradition
Duhem argues that physics is subject to certain methodological limitations that do not affect other sciences. In his The Aim and Structure of Physical Theory (1906), Duhem critiqued the Baconian notion of "crucial experiments". According to this critique, an experiment in physics is not simply an observation, but rather an interpretation of observations by means of a theoretical framework. Furthermore, no matter how well one constructs one's experiment, it is impossible to subject an isolated single hypothesis to an experimental test. Instead, it is a whole interlocking group of hypotheses, background assumptions, and theories that is tested. This thesis has come to be known as confirmation holism. This inevitable holism, according to Duhem, renders crucial experiments impossible. More generally, Duhem was critical of Newton's description of the method of physics as a straightforward "deduction" from facts and observations.

Duhem's philosophy of science and faith
In the appendix to The Aim and Structure, entitled "Physics of a Believer," Duhem draws out the implications that he sees his philosophy of science as having for those who argue that there is a conflict between physics and religion. He writes, "metaphysical and religious doctrines are judgments touching on objective reality, whereas the principles of physical theory are propositions relative to certain mathematical signs stripped of all objective existence. Since they do not have any common term, these two sorts of judgments can neither contradict nor agree with each other" (p. 285). Nonetheless, Duhem argues that it is important for the theologian or metaphysician to have detailed knowledge of physical theory in order not to make illegitimate use of it in speculations. Duhem's philosophy of science was criticized by one of his contemporaries, Abel Rey, in part because of what Rey perceived as influence on the part of Duhem's Catholic faith.  Although Duhem was indeed a believer, a sincere and fervent Catholic, he was eager to point out that his works in physics and chemistry should be considered on their own merits, independent of his religion. They were not examples of "Catholic science," nor even colored by his Catholic faith.

Works
Books

 (1886). Le Potentiel Thermodynamique et ses Applications à la Mécanique Chimique et à l'Étude des Phénomènes Électriques. Paris: A. Hermann.
 (1888). De l'Aimantation par Influence. Suivi de Propositions Données par la Faculté. Paris, Gauthier-Villars et Fils.
 (1891). Cours de Physique Mathématique et de Cristallographie de la Faculté des Sciences de Lille. Paris: A. Hermann.
 (1891–1892). Leçons sur l'Électricité et le Magnétisme. Paris: Gauthier-Villars et Fils, tome I (English EPUB), tome II (English EPUB), tome III (English EPUB).
 (1893). Introduction à la Mécanique Chimique. Paris: G. Carré.
 (1894). Sur les Déformations Permanentes et l'Hysteresis. Bruxelles: Impr. de Hayez.
 (1895). Les Théories de la Chaleur.
 (1896). Théorie Thermodynamique de la Viscosité, du Frottement et des faux Équilibres Chimiques. Paris: A. Hermann.
 (1897–1898). Traité Élémentaire de Mécanique Chimique Fondée sur la Thermodynamique. Paris: A. Hermann.
 (1897). Les Mélanges Doubles: Statique Chimique Générale des Systèmes Hétérogènes. 
 (1898). Faux Équilibres et Explosions.
 (1902). Le Mixte et la Combinaison Chimique. Essai sur l'Évolution d'une Idée. Paris: C. Naud.
 (1902). Les Théories Électriques de J. Clerk Maxwell: Étude Historique et Critique. Paris: A. Hermann.
 (1902). Thermodynamique et Chimie: Leçons Élémentaires à l'Usage des Chimistes. Paris: A. Hermann.
 (1903). Recherches sur l'Hydrodynamique. Paris: Gauthier-Villars.
 (1903). Les Origines de la Statique. Paris: A. Herman, tome I, tome II.
 (1905). L'Évolution de la Mécanique. Paris, A. Hermann.
 (1906). La Théorie Physique. Son Objet, sa Structure. Paris: Chevalier & Riviére (Vrin, 2007).
 (1906). Recherches sur l'Élasticité. Paris: Gauthier-Villars.
 (1903–13). Études sur Léonard de Vinci, ceux qu'il a lus, ceux qui l'ont lu, 3 vol., Paris: A. Hermann.
 Première série : Ceux qu'il a lu et ceux qui l'ont lu, 1906.
 Deuxième série.
 Troisième série : Les précurseurs parisiens de Galilée, 1913.
 (1908). Josiah-Willard Gibbs, à propos de la Publication de ses Mémoires Scientifiques. Paris: A. Hermann.
 (1908). Sauver les Phénomènes. Essai sur la Notion de Théorie Physique de Platon à Galilée. Paris: A. Hermann (Vrin, 2005).
 (1909). Le Mouvement Absolu et le Mouvement Relatif. Paris: Impr. Librairie de Montligeon. English EPUB
 (1911). Traité d'Énergétique. Paris: Gauthier-Villars, tome I (English EPUB), tome II (English EPUB).
 (1913–1959). Le Système du Monde. Histoire des Doctrines Cosmologiques de Platon à Copernic: tome I, tome II, tome III, tome IV, tome V, tome VI, tome VII, tome VIII, tome IX, tome X.
 (1915) La Science Allemande. Paris: A. Hermann.

Articles
 (1908). "La Valeur de la Théorie Physique," Journal de Mathémathiques Pures et Appliquées, Vol. XIX, pp. 7–19.
 (1908). "Ce que l'on Disait des Indes Occidentales avant Christophe Colomb," Journal de Mathémathiques Pures et Appliquées, Vol. XIX, pp. 402–406.
 (1909). "Note: Thierry de Chartres et Nicholas de Cues," Revues des Sciences Philosophiques et Théologiques, Troisième Année, pp. 525–531.
 (1911). "Sur les Petites Oscillations d'un Corps Flottant," Journal de Mathémathiques Pures et Appliquées, Vol. VII, Sixiéme Série, pp. 1–84.
 (1911). "Le Temps selon les Philosophes Hellénes," Part II, Revue de Philosophie, Vol. XIX, pp. 5–24, 128–145.
 (1914). "Roger Bacon et l'Horreur du Vide," in A.G. Little (ed.), Roger Bacon Essays. Oxford, at the Clarendon Press.
 (1915). "Quelques Réflexions sur la Science Allemande," Revue des Deux Mondes, Vol. XXV, pp. 657–686.
 (1916). "L'Optique de Malebranche," Revue de Métaphysique et de Morale, Vol. XXIII, No. 1, pp. 37–91.
Duhem's mathematics papers from NUMDAM

Works in English translation

 Excerpts: excerpt 1, & excerpt 2 "Heavenly bodies: Theory, physics and philosophy"
 "Physical Theory and Experiment," in Herbert Feigl & May Brodbeck (ed.), Readings in the Philosophy of Science. New York: Appleton-Century-Crofts, Inc., 1953, pp. 235–252.
 (excerpt)
  (excerpt: "The 12th century birth of the notion of mass which advised modern mechanics ... and void and movement in the void")
 Duhem, Pierre (1988). The Physicist as Artist: The Landscapes of Pierre Duhem. Edinburgh: Scottish Academic Press. 
 Duhem, Pierre (1990). "Logical Examination of Physical Theory," Synthese, Vol. 83, No. 2, pp. 183–188.
 Duhem, Pierre (1990). "Research on the History of Physical Theories," Synthese, Vol. 83, No. 2, pp. 189–200.
 Duhem, Pierre (1991). German Science. La Salle, Ill.: Open Court. 

  (EPUB)

Articles
"Physics & Metaphysics" (1893)
"Physics of a Believer"

Articles contributed to the 1912 Catholic Encyclopedia
History of Physics
Pierre de Maricourt
Jordanus de Nemore
Nicole Oresme
Albert of Saxony
Thierry of Freburg
Jean de Sax

The above bibliography is not exhaustive. See his complete primary sources and secondary sources at the Duhem entry of the Stanford Encyclopedia of Philosophy.

References

Sources

Dijksterhuis, E.J. (1959). "The Origins of Classical Mechanics from Aristotle to Newton", in M. Clagett (ed). Critical Problems in the History of Science, pp. 163–184. University of Wisconsin Press.
Hentschel, Klaus (1988). "Die Korrespondenz Duhem-Mach: Zur 'Modellbeladenheit' von Wissenschaftsgeschichte", Annals of Science, 73–91.
 

 

Moody, Ernest A. (1966). "Galileo and his Precursors", in C.L. Gollino, ed., Galileo Reappraised. Berkeley: University of California Press, 23–43.

Picard, Émile (1922). "La Vie et l'Oeuvre de Pierre Duhem," in Discours et Mélanges. Paris: Gauthier-Villars.

Further reading
 Alexander, Peter (1964). "The Philosophy of Science, 1850–1910," in D.J. O'Connor, ed., A Critical History of Western Philosophy. New York: The Free Press, pp. 402–425.
Ariew, Roger (2011) Pierre Duhem, Stanford Encyclopedia of Philosophy, January 20, 2011.

 
 Dawson, Christopher (1959). "The Scientific Development of Medieval Culture," in Medieval Essays. New York: Image Books, pp. 122–147.
 (EPUB)
 Deltete, Robert J. (2008). "Man of Science, Man of Faith: Pierre Duhem's 'Physique de Croyant'," Zygon 43 (3), pp. 627–637.
 Jaki, Stanley L. (1985–86). "Science and Censorship: Hélène Duhem and the Publication of the 'Système du Monde'," The Intercollegiate Review 21 (2), pp. 41–49 [Rep., in The Absolute Beneath the Relative and Other Essays. University Press of America, 1988].  [WARNING: Link leads to phishing website.]
 Jaki, Stanley L. (1992). Reluctant Heroine, The Life and Work of Helene Duhem. Scottish Academic Press.
 Jaki, Stanley L. (1993). "Medieval Christianity: Its Inventiveness in Technology and Science," in Technology in the Western Political Tradition. Ed. M.R. Zinman. Cornell University Press, pp. 46–68.
 Kahler, Erich (1943). "Reason and Science," in Man: The Measure. New York: Pantheon Books, Inc.
 Quinn, Philip L. (1974). "What Duhem Really Meant," in Robert S. Cohen & Marx W. Wartofsky, eds., Methodological and Historical Essays in the Natural and Social Sciences. Dordrecht: Reidel Publishing Company. 
 Schaffers, V. (1922). "Pierre Duhem et la Théorie Physique," Revue des Questions Scientifiques, pp. 42–73.

External links

 
Obituary, at Science
Works by Pierre Duhem, at Numdam
MacTutor Biography
Pierre Duhem, by Louis de Launay
The Duhem–Quine Thesis in Economics: A Reinterpretation
Pierre Duhem & Thomas Kuhn
Duhem's Bull

1861 births
1916 deaths
Catholic philosophers
Collège Stanislas de Paris alumni
Contributors to the Catholic Encyclopedia
École Normale Supérieure alumni
20th-century French physicists
Historians of astronomy
Historians of physics
Members of the Ligue de la patrie française
Philosophers of science
Relativity critics
Scientists from Paris
Thermodynamicists
19th-century French physicists